Mehmed Şakir Pasha,  also known as Kabaağaçlızade Mehmed Şakir Pasha (1855 – 1914) was an Ottoman-Kurdish diplomat, historian and army general, who participated in the Russo-Turkish War (1877–1878).

References

1855 births
1914 deaths
Ottoman Army generals